Ondina fragilissima is a species of sea snail, a marine gastropod mollusk in the family Pyramidellidae, the pyrams and their allies. The species name is Latin for "most fragile", and alludes to the limited consistency of the shell.

Distribution
The species is found in the Atlantic Ocean off Ghana and Guinea.

References

External links
 To Encyclopedia of Life

Pyramidellidae
Gastropods described in 2002
Invertebrates of West Africa